Shi Jin-Hua (born 1964) is a Taiwanese contemporary artist, known predominantly for conceptual arts and performance; notably for his work,《Pen Walking》, shown at Taipei Fine Arts Museum (2008). He currently lives and works in Kaohsiung, Taiwan.

Biography
Shi was born in Penghu in 1964. As an early diagnosed diabetic at age of 17, Shi started regular injection as part of his life; therefore, he's inspired to make arts of this measurement process in life, which comes from his inevitable routine of insulin injection since adolescence.

Education
Shi graduated from National Taiwan Normal University in 1990; he obtained M.F.A from University of California, Irvine in 1996. Since then, Shi has an extensive body of works, executed mostly by his body and performance.

Awards
Shi is the recipient of many important awards in his career.
2007,《2007 Taipei Arts Award》, First Prize, Taipei, Taiwan
2007,《The 10th Li Chun-Shan Foundation Visual Arts Award》, First Prize, Taiwan
2007,《2007 Kaohsiung Award》, First Prize, Kaohsiung, Taiwan
2003,《Taipei Biennial Award》, First Prize, Taipei, Taiwan
1986,《The 11th Hsiung-Shih New Artists Prize 》, First prize, Taipei, Taiwan,

Exhibitions
Shi's works appear in many solo and group exhibitions. Shi's works have appeared at the solo exhibition,《Launching Ceremony of Shi Jin-Hua’s Album and Art Today on View》, Mind Set Art Center, Taipei, Taiwan (2013);《Bodhi Project•Midway-Shi Jinhau X Bodhi Trees Documenta》, Providence University, Taichung, Taiwan/ National Changhua University of Education, Changhua, Taiwan (2012);《HONG KONG INTERNATIONAL ART FAIR》, Beijing Commune，Hong Kong(2012);《Medi(t)ation – 2011 Asian Art Biennial》, National Taiwan Museum of Fine Arts, Taichung, Taiwan(2011);《Shi Jin-Hua Solo Exhibition – Pass Through a Year》, Mind Set Art Center, Taipei, Taiwan (2011);《The Trilogy of Contemporary Art Alchemy》, Inart Space, Tainan, Taiwan (2010);《Pen Walking》, Taipei Fine Art Museum, Taipei, Taiwan(2008);《Relative Measurement》, Kuandu Biennale, Kuandu Museum of Fine Arts, Taipei, Taiwan (2008);《Jokes Project》, Art Center, Providence University, Taichung, Taiwan(2005);
《Pencil Walker－The Performance and Documentation of Shi, Jin-Hua》, Hua-Shan Arts District, Taipei, Taiwan (2000);《Watch Steps》, The Art Gallery, University of California at Irvine, CA, USA (1996).

Collections
Shi's works are in permanent collections of museums and private collections. 
《Pen Walking #125》, White Rabit Gallery, Australia(2013);
《Pen Walking #50》, Kaohsiung Museum of Fine Arts, Taiwan(2010);
《Clothing Project》, National Taiwan Museum of Fine Arts, Taiwan(2009);
《Jokes Project》, National Taiwan Museum of Fine Arts, Taiwan(2007);
《Searching Center and Boundary – Manhattan version》, National Taiwan Museum of Fine Arts, Taiwan(2005).

Publication

2008, 《Pen Walking》, Taipei Fine Arts Museum, Taiwan
2005,《Jokes Project》, Providence University, Taiwan
1993,《Money for Nothing》, a documentation of solo exhibition at Taipei Fine Arts Museum, Doors Art Company, Taiwan

See also
Taiwanese art

References

External links
Official Website of Shi Jin-Hua
Shi's Page on IT Park
Mind Set Art Center
Soka Art Center
第9屆台新藝術獎入圍者群像 石晉華 - 當代藝術煉金術三部曲
石晉華 以走筆思考人生
East Association, Artists 2012

Taiwanese painters
Taiwanese contemporary artists
1964 births
Living people
University of California, Irvine alumni